Brian Coburn may refer to:

 Brian Coburn (politician), Canadian politician
 Brian Coburn (actor), British actor